Donald Tucker may refer to:

 Donald Kofi Tucker (1938–2005), American politician in New Jersey
 Donald L. Tucker (born 1935), American politician in Florida